A House in the Hills is a 1993 film directed by Ken Wiederhorn. It stars Michael Madsen and Helen Slater.

Plot
Alex is an aspiring actress, working as a waitress to make ends meet while she prepares to audition for a TV soap opera. To earn some extra money, she agrees to house-sit the home of friends for the weekend.

The friends feel obligated to let Alex know that a robbery and murder has recently taken place at the house next door. Although she pretends to be unconcerned, Alex is understandably on edge when a stranger, Mickey, turns up at the house. He is a thief who holds her captive, but has a way about him that attracts Alex as well.

Cast
Michael Madsen as Mickey
Helen Slater as Alex Weaver
Jeffrey Tambor as Willie
James Laurenson as Ronald Rankin
Elyssa Davalos as Sondra Rankin

References

External links

1993 films
1990s English-language films
1993 crime thriller films
1990s erotic drama films
1990s psychological thriller films
American erotic drama films
American erotic thriller films
1990s erotic thriller films
Films shot in California
Films set in California
Films about actors
Films directed by Ken Wiederhorn
Films scored by Richard Einhorn
1993 drama films
1990s American films